The Last Door is a 1921 American silent mystery film directed by William P.S. Earle and starring Eugene O'Brien, Nita Naldi and Charles Craig.

Cast
 Eugene O'Brien as he Magnet
 Charles Craig as Freddie Tripp
 Nita Naldi as The Widow
 Helen Pillsbury as Mrs. Rogers
 Martha Mansfield as Helen Rogers
 Katherine Perry as Guest
 Warren Cook as Colonel

References

Bibliography
 Munden, Kenneth White. The American Film Institute Catalog of Motion Pictures Produced in the United States, Part 1. University of California Press, 1997.

External links
 

1921 films
1921 mystery films
American silent feature films
American mystery films
American black-and-white films
Films directed by William P. S. Earle
Selznick Pictures films
1920s English-language films
1920s American films
Silent mystery films